Presta may refer to:
 Apco Presta, an Israeli paraglider design
 Presta valve, a bicycle tire valve style